A referendum on establishing thirteen provinces was held in Slovenia on 22 June 2008. While turnout was only 10.9% of registered voters, voters in all but one of the thirteen proposed provinces approved the change, the exception being central Slovenia. The referendum was not binding, and a parliamentary decision to establish the provinces was expected later in 2008. While the government explained the necessity of the reform with the fact that Slovenia is the only EU country not to have primary subdivisions, and that it would lead to better administration, the opposition criticised the large number of provinces and called for abstention in the referendum.

References

2008 in Slovenia
2008 referendums
Referendums in Slovenia
June 2008 events in Europe